The Nkumpi River is a smallish river in central Limpopo Province, South Africa. It flows southeastwards and is a tributary of the Olifants River, joining the left bank in the river's central basin.

Sources 
Source coordinates:

See also
 List of rivers of South Africa

References

Olifants River (Limpopo)
Rivers of Limpopo